Víctor Hugo Mareco (born 26 February 1984, in Asunción) is a Paraguayan football defender. He currently plays for Club Cerro Porteño. He was the Brescia Calcio's long serving defender who spent ten years with the Italian club.

Mareco played for Paraguay at the 2001 FIFA U-17 World Championship and the 2003 FIFA World Youth Championship.

Paraguay
He made his international debut for Paraguay in 2012 vs  USA.

References

External links
 (Spanish).

1984 births
Living people
Paraguayan footballers
Paraguayan expatriate footballers
Paraguay international footballers
Paraguay under-20 international footballers
Paraguayan expatriate sportspeople in Italy
Brescia Calcio players
Hellas Verona F.C. players
Cerro Porteño players
Serie A players
Serie B players
Paraguayan Primera División players
Expatriate footballers in Italy
Association football defenders